Álvaro Gutiérrez may refer to:
 Álvaro Gutiérrez (politician), Peruvian politician
 Álvaro Gutiérrez (footballer) (born 1968), former Uruguayan football midfielder